The 1979 NAIA Soccer Championship was the 21st annual tournament held by the NAIA to determine the national champion of men's college soccer among its members in the United States and Canada.

Two-time defending champions Quincy (IL) defeated Rockhurst in the final, 1–0, to claim the Hawks' ninth NAIA national title.

The final was  played at Sangamon State University in Springfield, Illinois.

Qualification

The tournament field expended for the first time since 1968, increasing from eight to ten teams. Third- and fifth- placed finals remained in place, while the seventh-placed final was removed.

Brackets

Championship

Consolation

See also  
 1979 NCAA Division I Soccer Tournament
 1979 NCAA Division II Soccer Championship
 1979 NCAA Division III Soccer Championship

References 

NAIA championships
NAIA
1979 in sports in Illinois